The National Hi-Tech Crime Unit (NHTCU) previously formed part of the National Crime Squad, a British Police organisation which dealt with major crime.

The National Hi-Tech Crime Unit was created in 2001 as a result of an Association of Chief Police Officers (ACPO) initiative. The organisation investigated serious and organised crime committed over the Internet, such as hacking, carding, virus-writers, internet fraud and other hi-tech crimes involving the use of computers and telecommunications equipment.

On 1 April 2006, it ceased to exist. However, many of its staff and duties were transferred to the e-crime unit of the UK's new Serious Organised Crime Agency (SOCA).

See also
 Police National E-Crime Unit

References

External links
Launch of the United Kingdom's first National Hi-Tech Crime Unit 18 April 2001

2001 establishments in the United Kingdom
2006 disestablishments in the United Kingdom
Cybercrime in the United Kingdom
Defunct law enforcement agencies of the United Kingdom
Government agencies established in 2001
Government agencies disestablished in 2006
Information technology organisations based in the United Kingdom